Srđan Urošević (born 30 April 1984, in Belgrade) is a Serbian football midfielder who is currently Free agent.

External sources
 Profile at Srbijafudbal
 

1983 births
Living people
Footballers from Belgrade
Serbian footballers
Serbian expatriate footballers
FK Obilić players
FK Zemun players
FK Bežanija players
FK Smederevo players
Serbian SuperLiga players
Eliteserien players
Esteghlal F.C. players
Expatriate footballers in Iran
Hamarkameratene players
Expatriate footballers in Norway
Association football midfielders
Expatriate footballers in Greece